Asian Journal may refer to

 Asian Journal of Communication
 Asian Journal of Distance Education
 Asian Journal of International Law
 Asian Journal of Mathematics
 Asian Journal of Pentecostal Studies
 Asian Journal of Public Affairs
 Asian Journal of Pharmaceutics
 Asian Journal of Social Psychology
 Asian Journal of Transfusion Science
 The Journal of Asian Studies
 Asian Journal (newspaper), a Filipino-American newspaper